Rudolf Styskalik (18 May 1929 – 26 August 2005) was an Austrian water polo player. He competed in the men's tournament at the 1952 Summer Olympics.

References

External links
 

1929 births
2005 deaths
Austrian male water polo players
Olympic water polo players of Austria
Water polo players at the 1952 Summer Olympics
Place of birth missing